Jeff Moore (March 15, 1966 – November 29, 2022) was an American basketball player. He was drafted by the Charlotte Hornets in the third round of 1988 NBA Draft. He played his collegiate career for the Auburn Tigers men's basketball from 1984 to 1988.

College career
In his four seasons at Auburn, Moore was a two-time All-SEC player after taking over the starting center job following the departure of Charles Barkley to the NBA. He played in the NCAA Tournament in each of his four seasons and left the school as its second all-time leader in rebounds with 950 and eight on the all-time scoring list with 1,549 career points.

Professional career
Moore was drafted by the Charlotte Hornets in the third round of the 1988 NBA draft. On August 17, he signed a contract with the Hornets but was waived by the team on October 31, 1988, before the start of the regular season.

Personal life and death
Moore died on November 29, 2022.

References

External links
Profile at Auburn Tigers men's basketball
College statistics at sports-reference.com

1966 births
2022 deaths
American men's basketball players
Auburn Tigers men's basketball players
Charlotte Hornets draft picks
Centers (basketball)
Power forwards (basketball)